Gerald Allen (born June 26, 1941) is a former American football running back in the National Football League (NFL) for the Washington Redskins and Baltimore Colts.  

He was born in Canton, Ohio. He played college football at the University of Omaha (now the University of Nebraska-Omaha) and was drafted in the eighth round of the 1966 NFL Draft.  Allen was also picked in the eleventh round of the 1966 AFL Draft by the New York Jets.  he is tied with eleven players for the longest career reception: a 99-yard pass play from Hall of Fame quarterback Sonny Jurgensen during a September 15, 1968, game against the Chicago Bears.

References

1941 births
Living people
Players of American football from Canton, Ohio
American football running backs
Nebraska Cornhuskers football players
Baltimore Colts players
Washington Redskins players